KLEY-FM (95.7 MHz, "Tejano 95.7 & 103.3") is a commercial radio station licensed to Jourdanton, Texas, and serving the San Antonio metropolitan area.  The station is currently owned by Alpha Media and licensed to Alpha Media Licensee, LLC. KLEY-FM broadcasts a Tejano music format. The studios are on Eisenhauer Road in Northeast San Antonio.

KLEY-FM has an effective radiated power (ERP) of 11,000 watts.  The transmitter site is on Route 300 near Farm-to-Market Road in Charlotte, Texas.

History
Before the station was built, the construction permit was given the call sign KBOP-FM on April 6, 1998.  On October 2, 2000, it changed its call sign to KBUC-FM.  KBUC-FM signed on in 2001.  

On February 2, 2005, the call letters were switched to KLEY-FM.

On May 6, 2019, sister station 103.1 KHHL Karnes City dropped its ESPN Deportes Radio programming to simulcast KLEY-FM.

On February 23, 2022, at 11 a.m., KLEY-FM flipped from Regional Mexican as "La Ley 95.7" to Tejano as "Tejano 95.7".

On June 9, 2022, KLEY-FM started simulcasting on 94.1 KTFM-HD3 FM and translator K227CX 103.3 FM in San Antonio Texas.

References

External links

LEY-FM
Radio stations established in 1998
1998 establishments in Texas
Alpha Media radio stations
Tejano music